Noble Township is one of twelve townships in Jay County, Indiana, United States. As of the 2010 census, its population was 640 and it contained 253 housing units.

History
Noble Township was organized in 1837. It was named for Noah Noble, 5th Governor of Indiana.

Geography
The streams of East Prong Franks Drain, Sycamore Fork and West Prong Franks Drain run through this township.

Unincorporated towns
 Bellfountain
 Brice
 Noble

Major highways

References
 U.S. Board on Geographic Names (GNIS)
 United States Census Bureau cartographic boundary files

External links
 Indiana Township Association
 United Township Association of Indiana

Townships in Jay County, Indiana
Townships in Indiana